Chromulinaceae is a family of golden algae in the order Ochromonadales.

References

External links 
 
 Chromulinaceae at AlgaeBase
 Chromulinaceae at NCBI

Chrysophyceae
Algae families
Heterokont families